Yoyetta celis, the silver princess, is a species of cicada in the family Cicadidae found in southeastern Australia.

References

Further reading

 

 

 

Cicadas
Insects described in 1988